Collage: A Concerto for Four Horns and Orchestra is a concerto for four horns and orchestra by the American composer James Horner.  The piece was commissioned by the Houston Symphony and the International Horn Society and was premiered on March 27, 2015, at the Royal Festival Hall in London.  The premiere was conducted by Jaime Martín and performed by the London Philharmonic Orchestra with soloists David Pyatt, John Ryan, James Thatcher, and Richard Watkins.  Collage was Horner's last completed concert work before his death in June 2015.

Composition
The London Philharmonic announced in January 2014 that it would be premiering a new concerto by James Horner—the news came only a few months before the premiere of Horner's double concerto for violin and cello, Pas de Deux.  Horner had previously worked with three of the four soloists on his film scores and had himself played the French horn in his youth.  In the program notes for the world premiere, Horner commented on the inception of the piece, saying:

Reception
Critical response to Collage has been mixed.  Colin Anderson of Classical Source criticized the work as one of "Horner's inoffensive if more and more dull piece[s]," saying, "His Collage started promisingly with an ear-catching refrain, giving the scenic impression of the four horn-players calling across mountaintops, descriptive music that went straight to the senses. But not for long, for Horner's reliance on repetition and trite motifs made the piece blander and blander."  The music critic Alan Sanders similarly praised the orchestration while criticizing the form, saying:

Recording
A recording of Collage was made by the London Philharmonic Orchestra and the original soloists shortly before Horner's death.  It was released commercially through Decca Records on September 23, 2016.

References

Compositions by James Horner
2015 compositions
Horn concertos
Concertos for multiple instruments
21st-century classical music
Music commissioned by the Houston Symphony